Sonom (died circa June 13–14, 1776) was a chieftain of the rGyalrong people in China. He was the lord-lama of Greater Jinchuan. He was executed after his January 1776 defeat in the Jinchuan campaigns.

Family
Sonom was the fourth son of Langkya , who was the previous ruler of Greater Jinchuan. Sonom's mother was Atsang , and his eldest brother was Shaloben Gangdak.

According to the Jinchuan suoji ("Petty Notes on Jinchuan")  3 by Li Xinheng , a paternal aunt of Sonom was the wife of Senggesang . Langkya's daughter married Senggesang. Therefore, Langkya is also Sonom's great-uncle.

Sonom's grandfather was Leržirhi . One of Sonom's aunts was Atsing . He had a nephew, Dundju Wangdjar.

Career
Sonom, along with Langyka, supported Senggesang's military campaigns. They argued in favor of their actions in reports they sent to the Chinese government. At 19 sui Sonom became the leader of Greater Jichuan after Langkya's death. At the beginning of his rule, Atsang and Atsing assisted him. Ulrich Theobald, author of "The Second Jinchuan Campaign (1771 – 1776) Economic, Social and Political Aspects of an Important Qing Period Border War", wrote that Sonom "hesitated a long time before promising his support to Lesser Jinchuan during the second Jinchuan war."

Death
In January 1776 his forces were defeated in the Jinchuan wars of the Ten Great Campaigns. He and his family were presented to the Emperor of China.

Circa June 13–14, 1776, Sonom and other rebel leaders were executed by lingchi. Of his family, some of the women were enslaved and given to lords of the Ölöd Mongol and Solun. Other women and the children were sentenced to life imprisonment.

Misidentification as a Hmong king
The 1988 book Hmong: History of a People by H. Keith Quincy stated that Sonom was a Hmong king. The book by Quincy, cited by others, stated that in 1772 Sonom had defeated a Chinese army and that Sonom had held the Chinese government forces at bay for four years. According to the Quincy account, ultimately Sonom surrendered when the Chinese promised that his family would survive if he did so. Instead he and his family were executed. Paul Hillmer, the author of the A People’s History of the Hmong, wrote that "This compelling story helps set a dramatic tone for discussing the Hmong's life of hardship in China".

Robert Entenmann, author of "The Myth of Sonom, the Hmong King," stated that Sonom in fact was not Hmong. Entenmann argued that the use of the word "Miao" was imprecise during the time when Jean Joseph Marie Amiot wrote an account of the Jinchuan Wars, since the Qing government under the Qianlong Emperor referred to all ethnic minorities in Southwest China as "Miao people". Amiot uses "Miao-tsée" to refer to the Gyalrong people, of which Sonom was a part. This is distinct from the word "Miaozu".

François Marie Savina, in Histoire des Miao, reprinted the account by Amiot. Entenmann stated that Savina made the error confusing the Gyalrong for the Hmong because he "was unfamiliar with Chinese history and the subtleties of Chinese vocabulary" even though he had studied Chinese. The word "Miao" in general was also used to refer to Hmong people. Entenmann stated that the book Hmong: History of a People "does not offer a reliable history of the Hmong in China" because Quincy was "evidently not trained as a historian" and did not read Chinese, so he introduced the error made by Savina. Jean Mottin also included the Savina account in The History of the Hmong (Meo).

Anne Fadiman in her book The Spirit Catches You and You Fall Down cited Quincy and stated that Sonom was Hmong. Entenmann wrote that because of the reliance on Quincy's book, Fadiman's book propagated the mistaken idea that Sonom was a Hmong king.

Hillmer wrote that Entenmann's article "has largely proved[...]that Sonom was not Hmong".

Notes

References
 Entenmann, Robert (St. Olaf College). "The Myth of Sonom, the Hmong King" (Archive). Hmong Studies Journal, Volume 6, 2005. p. 1. Retrieved on July 11, 2014.
 Theobald, Ulrich. "The Second Jinchuan Campaign (1771 – 1776) Economic, Social and Political Aspects of an Important Qing Period Border War" (Archive) (PhD thesis). University of Tübingen, 2010.

Citations

1776 deaths
18th-century monarchs in Asia
Year of birth unknown
Tibetan kings